DeKalb massacre may refer to:

Johann de Kalb (1721–1780), German soldier shot during the Battle of Camden in South Carolina, 1780
Indian Creek massacre, 1832, near DeKalb County, Illinois
Northern Illinois University shooting, 2008